The Essential David Allan Coe is a compilation album of highlights from singer/songwriter David Allan Coe's career.

Track listing 
All songs written by David Allan Coe except where noted

"The Ride" (J.B. Detterline Jr, Gary Gentry) - 3:07
"Would You Lay With Me (in a Field of Stone)" - 2:49
"You Never Even Called Me By My Name" (Steve Goodman) - 5:14
"Willie, Waylon and Me" - 3:12
"Longhaired Redneck" (David Allan Coe, Jimmy Rabbitt) - 3:21
"If That Ain't Country" (David Allan Coe, Fred Spears) - 4:49
"Take This Job and Shove It" - 2:57
"(If I Could Climb) The Walls of the Bottle" (Don Goodman, Dan Seals) - 2:15
"Jack Daniel's, If You Please" - 3:17
"Tennessee Whiskey" (Dean Dillon, Linda Hargrove) - 2:59
"Now I Lay Me Down to Cheat" (Walt Aldridge, Billy Henderson) - 3:22
"Mona Lisa Lost Her Smile" (Johnny Cunningham) - 3:39
"Don't Cry Darlin'" (Dean Dillion) - 2:49
"Need a Little Time Off for Bad Behavior" (Bobby Keel, David Allan Coe, Larry Latimer) - 3:00

Chart performance

References 

David Allan Coe compilation albums
Albums produced by Billy Sherrill
2004 greatest hits albums
Columbia Records compilation albums